Paweł Czenpiński (1755–1793 ) was a Polish physician, botanist, zoologist, entomologist and educator.

Czenpinski graduated in 1780 from the University of Vienna.
He was, in Poland, an employee of the Society for Elementary Books (established in 1775 and empowered to develop programs and school textbooks) and was a member of the National Education Commission. Together with Walenty Gagatkiewicz he founded the Warsaw School of Anatomy and Surgery (1789).

In 1782 he went on a scientific expedition with John Dominic Peter Jaskiewicz (1749–1809) to make zoological, botanical and geological observations of the Carpathian Mountains.

He was the author of Dissertatio inauguralis zoologico-medica, sistens totius regni animalis genera, in classes et ordines Linnæana methodo digesta, præfixa cuilibet classi terminorum explicatione, quam annuente inclyta facultate medica in antiquissima ac celeberrima Universitate Vindobonensi publicæ disquisitioni submittit Paulus de Czenpinski, nobilis Polonus Varsoviensis. Disputabitur in universitatis palatio. Die mensis Aprilis anno 1778 GDZ in which he described Gibbium psylloides and later of textbooks issued by the Commission of National Education: Botany for National Schools (1785, with J.K. Kluki) and Zoology for National Schools (1789)

References
 Czenpiński Paweł

Polish entomologists
18th-century Polish botanists
1755 births
1793 deaths